Mount Alchanon, also known as Mount Alchanar, is one of the high elevation peaks in the Cordillera Central mountain range in the Philippines. It is located in the province of Kalinga near the border of northern portion of Mountain Province in the island of Luzon.

References

Mountains of the Philippines
Landforms of Mountain Province